Vasoplegic syndrome (VPS) is a postperfusion syndrome characterized by low systemic vascular resistance and a high cardiac output.

Causes
VPS occurs more frequently after on pump CABG surgery versus off pump CABG surgery.  Hypothermia during surgery may also increase ones risk of developing VPS post operatively.

Diagnosis

Definition
Vasoplegic syndrome is defined as low systemic vascular resistance (SVR index <1,600 dyn∙sec/cm5/m2) and high cardiac output (cardiac index >2.5 L/min/m2) within the first 4 postoperative hours.

Treatment

There is some evidence to support the use of methylene blue in the treatment of this condition.

Epidemiology
One case series reports a rate of 1 in 120 cases.

References

Cardiac surgery
Syndromes